Brunate is a town and comune in the province of Como in northern Italy, some  northeast of Milan. It has some 1,800 residents, but is much more populated in summer, when tourists rent houses and apartments.

For a short time in the late 12th century Brunate was an independent commune, but in 1240 it reverted to the suzerainty of Como.

Como and Brunate are linked by a steep, narrow, winding road, and by the Como to Brunate funicular.

Alessandro Volta lived in Brunate for a short period – the Faro Voltiano lighthouse in the San Maurizio district, was built and named in his honour.  The Bulgarian poet Pencho Slaveykov died in the town on 10 June 1912.

References

External links 
 
 Official site of the Brunate commune 

Municipalities of the Province of Como